This list of botanical gardens and arboretums in Oklahoma is intended to include all significant botanical gardens and arboretums in the U.S. state of Oklahoma

See also
List of botanical gardens and arboretums in the United States

References 

 
Arboreta in Oklahoma
botanical gardens and arboretums in Oklahoma